The North Hunterdon-Voorhees Regional High School District is a regional, four-year public high school district, that serves students in ninth through twelfth grades from twelve municipalities in northern Hunterdon County, New Jersey, United States. Students in the district are from Bethlehem Township, Califon Borough, Clinton Town, Clinton Township, Franklin Township, Glen Gardner Borough, Hampton Borough, High Bridge Borough, Lebanon Borough, Lebanon Township, Tewksbury Township and Union Township.

As of the 2020–21 school year, the district, comprised of two schools, had an enrollment of 2,275 students and 194.8 classroom teachers (on an FTE basis), for a student–teacher ratio of 11.7:1.

The district is classified by the New Jersey Department of Education as being in District Factor Group "I", the second-highest of eight groupings. District Factor Groups organize districts statewide to allow comparison by common socioeconomic characteristics of the local districts. From lowest socioeconomic status to highest, the categories are A, B, CD, DE, FG, GH, I and J.

History
In a June 1947 referendum, 11 of the 13 municipalities voted in favor of the formation of a regional high school district, with Bloomsbury and High Bridge opting out, leading to a reduction to the size of the plans for the school building, which was scaled down from an original planned enrollment of 700, down to 600 students. A referendum the next month failed when 10 of the 11 municipalities voted in favor by a better than 5-1 margin, while Franklin Township voters rejected the proposal. All 11 of the districts voted to approve a February 1950 referendum for a building that would cost $700,000 (equivalent to $ in ). North Hunterdon Regional High School opened in September 1951 with 517 students in a 27-room facility constructed on a  site.

Voorhees High School, constructed at a cost of $7.5 million (equivalent to $ million in ), opened for the 1975-76 school year.

The Clinton Township School District had undertaken a project to consider the possibility of withdrawing from the North Hunterdon-Voorhees Regional High School District to form an independent K-12 school district. In February 2005, the Clinton Township Board of Education commissioned a study to consider the educational and financial effects of a proposed withdrawal scenario for Clinton Township, citing higher costs assessed to township residents under the funding formula then in place, through the district ultimately withdrew its withdrawal petition in December 2006.

Awards and recognition
For the 2001–02 school year, North Hunterdon High School received the Blue Ribbon Award from the United States Department of Education, the highest honor that an American school can achieve. 

In 2015, Voorhees High School was one of 15 schools in New Jersey, and one of nine public schools, recognized as a National Blue Ribbon School in the exemplary high performing category.

Schools 
Schools in the district (with 2020–21 enrollment data from the National Center for Education Statistics) are:
North Hunterdon High School is located in Clinton Township (although the mailing address is Annandale). The school served 1,257 students from Bethlehem Township, Clinton Town, Clinton Township, Franklin Township, Lebanon Borough and Union Township.
Dr. Gregory Cottrell, Principal
Voorhees High School is located in Lebanon Township (although the mailing address is Glen Gardner). The school served 991 students from Califon, Glen Gardner, Hampton, High Bridge, Lebanon Township and Tewksbury Township.
Ron Peterson, Principal

Administration
Core members of the district's administration are:
Jeffrey Bender, Superintendent
Katie Blew, Business Administrator / Board Secretary

Board of education
The district's board of education, comprised of 12 members, sets policy and oversees the fiscal and educational operation of the district through its administration. As a Type II school district, the board's trustees are elected directly by voters to serve three-year terms of office on a staggered basis, with four seats up for election each year held (since 2012) as part of the November general election. The board appoints a superintendent to oversee the day-to-day operation of the district. Seats on the board are allocated to the constituent municipalities and are assigned weighted votes based on population, with the total number of weighted votes equal to 12.1: Clinton Township and Lebanon Borough are allocated four seats between them, each with 0.9 weighted votes (a total of 3.6); High Bridge and Lebanon Township are allocated two seats between them, each with 1.2 votes (total of 2.4); Clinton Town, Franklin Township and Glen Gardner have two seats between them, each with 0.9 votes (total of 1.8); Califon and Tewksbury Township are allocated two seats between them, each with 0.8 weighted votes (total of 1.6); Union Township is assigned one seat with 1.4 weighted votes; and Bethlehem Township and Hampton are assigned one seat between them, with 1.3 weighted votes.

References

External links 
North Hunterdon-Voorhees Regional High School District website

School Data for the North Hunterdon-Voorhees Regional High School District, National Center for Education Statistics

1950 establishments in New Jersey
School districts established in 1950
Bethlehem Township, New Jersey
Califon, New Jersey
Clinton, New Jersey
Clinton Township, New Jersey
Franklin Township, Hunterdon County, New Jersey
Glen Gardner, New Jersey
Hampton, New Jersey
High Bridge, New Jersey
Lebanon, New Jersey
Lebanon Township, New Jersey
Tewksbury Township, New Jersey
Union Township, Hunterdon County, New Jersey
New Jersey District Factor Group I
School districts in Hunterdon County, New Jersey